Uxia may refer to:

 Uxía (born 1962), Galician singer Uxía Senlle
 Uxía Martínez Botana, Galician double bass player
 Uxia, a synonym for Clemensia, a genus of moths in the family Erebidae